Boletus flammans is a species of bolete fungus found in North America. It was described scientifically by Esther A. Dick and Wally Snell in 1965.

See also
List of Boletus species
List of North American boletes

References

External links
 

flammans
Fungi described in 1965
Fungi of North America